The Treaty of Turin, signed on 29 August 1696 by the French King and the Duchy of Savoy, ended the latter's involvement in the Nine Years' War. 

Savoy signed a separate peace with France and left the Grand Alliance, an anti-French coalition formed on 20 December 1689 by England, the Dutch Republic and Emperor Leopold. 

On 7 October 1696, the treaty was followed by the Convention of Vigevano in which France, Savoy, Leopold and Spain agreed a general ceasefire in Italy. The Treaty of Turin was made part of the 1697 Treaty of Ryswick.

Background

Northern Italy provided access to the southern borders of France and Austria, which made the Duchy of Milan and Duchy of Savoy essential to their security. In 1631, France annexed Pinerolo in Piedmont and occupied Casale Monferrato and much of the Duchy of Savoy was in modern France, including the County of Nice and County of Savoy. Savoy was considered a minor power and seen by many as a French satellite state.

During the 1688-89 Nine Years' War between France and a coalition opposing it that included the Grand Alliance, Savoy was important for two reasons. Although France's northern borders had been strengthened by new fortifications, those in the south-east remained relatively weak. Also, the Camisard revolt in south-western France by Huguenots after the 1685 Edict of Fontainebleau provided opportunities for outside intervention. In early 1690, the Allies began recruiting support for the Camisards among Huguenot exiles and the "Vaudois", Protestants living what is now Swiss Canton of Vaud and persecuted by both Savoy and France. By summer 1690, it had become clear that Savoy would be involved on one side or the other.

Faced with that choice, the Duke of Savoy, Victor Amadeus, ended his persecution of the Vaudois and joined the Alliance. His primary objective was to regain Pinerolo and Casale, which were strategic locations controlling access to his capital, Turin. A French force, led by Nicolas Catinat, defeated a Savoyard army at Staffarda in August 1690. Savoy was nearly overrun in late 1691 but was saved by reinforcements from Spain, Bavaria and Brandenburg-Prussia. In 1692, Victor Amadeus made a short-lived invasion of the Dauphiné, the only Allied incursion into French territory during the entire war.

The war was financially crippling for participants, especially France, which was nearly forced into bankruptcy by fighting the Grand Alliance on its own. Combined with crop failures in France and northern Italy between 1693 and 1695, widespread famine was caused, with Piedmont being one of the worst affected areas.

In October 1693, Savoy suffered a second defeat at Marsaglia, which had little strategic impact but showed decisive victory over France remained elusive after three years of war. In late 1694, Emperor Leopold I, a Habsburg, informed Victor Amadeus that his primary objective for 1695 was Casale, which he claimed as an Imperial possession. Replacing the French garrison with an Imperial one would not benefit Savoy. 

Draft peace terms presented by France to the Allies in November 1694 made no mention of Pinerolo. When asked for clarification, French diplomats stated that they had no intention of relinquishing it. That was almost certainly a ploy by Louis, who wanted to divide the Allies, but it implied that Savoy might lose both of its key objectives. The lack of firm guarantees from Leopold made Victor Amadeus step up the informal talks that had begun in 1693.

France secretly agreed to surrender Casale to Savoy if its defences were destroyed. After a token resistance, Casale capitulated in early July, and Victor Amadeus took possession. The Allies were increasingly suspicious but agreed to besiege Pinerolo.

To preserve secrecy, the treaty negotiations were conducted by the French commander at Pinerolo, the Comte de Tessé, for Louis XIV and Savoy's senior diplomat, Carlo Giuseppe Vittorio Carron, Marquis de St-Thomas.

Provisions
All Savoyard territories occupied by France would be returned, including Pinerolo after its fortifications had been destroyed, and Savoyard Protestants would be prevented from supporting French Camisard rebels. Victor Amadeus's longstime French-born mistress, Jeanne Baptiste d'Albert de Luynes, helped broker the marriage of his eldest daughter, Marie Adélaïde of Savoy, to Louis's grandson, the Duke of Burgundy. That increased Savoy's status within Europe, and a series of deaths in the French Royal Family meant that Marie Adélaïde's younger son would succeed his great-grandfather in 1715 as Louis XV.

Terms were finally agreed by the end of June, but the treaty was signed only on 29 August to allow Bavaria, Brandenburg-Prussia and Spain to withdraw their contingents from the forces outside Pinerolo.

Aftermath

The most controversial clause and the one that caused the most damage to Savoy's reputation was an agreement to help France compel its former Allies to agree a truce. In September 1696, a combined Savoyard-French army besieged Valenza, then part of the Duchy of Milan. On 7 October, France, Savoy, Emperor Leopold and Spain  signed the Convention of Vigevano, establishing an armistice. The war was formally ended by the 1697 Treaty of Ryswick which incorporated the Treaty of Turin.

By splitting the Allies, Savoy's defection might have enabled Louis to obtain better terms at Ryswick than otherwise for a relatively minor cost. France relinquished Pinerolo, but Savoy's territories in Transalpine France were almost impossible to defend and were occupied by France again from 1704 to 1714. 

Victor Amadeus achieved his primary goals of recovering Pinerolo and Casale, and his daughter's marriage enhanced Savoy's position on the European stage. The cost was a devastated and impoverished country and "a reputation for...cynical self-interest he would never shake off, (that) earned the enmity of his former allies but not the friendship of Louis XIV". 

Cynical opportunism was not limited to Victor Amadeus; his allies found Leopold and his successors equally frustrating, and Britain's effective withdrawal from the War of the Spanish Succession in 1712 was similarly damaging. However, deserved or not, that perception was reinforced when Savoy switched sides in 1703 from France to the reformed Grand Alliance.

Notes

References

Sources
 Jacques, Bernard; The acts and negotiations, together with the particular articles at large of the general peace, concluded at Ryswick, by the most illustrious confederates with the French king to which is premised, the negotiations and articles of the peace, concluded at Turin, between the same prince and the Duke of Savoy; (http://name.umdl.umich.edu/A27483.0001.001)
 
 
 
 
 
 

1696 treaties
Treaties of the Kingdom of France
Treaties of the Duchy of Savoy
1690s in Italy
Nine Years' War